The House of Iljo Filipovski is a historical house in Galičnik that is listed as Cultural heritage of North Macedonia. It is in ownership of one branch of the family of Filipovski.

History of the family
The family of Filipovci shares ancestral roots with the families of Golčevci, Sarievski, Drenkovci, Eftovci, Boškovci, Sekulovci and Bimbaškovci.

Notable members of the family
 Slavko ― progenitor of the family.
Filip 'Glava' ― one of the richest sheep and cattle owners in the late 19th century.
 Jovan Filiposki ― son of Gjorgji.
 Kire Filipovski ― grandson of Filip 'Glava'.
 Rade Filiposki ― member of the League of Communist Youth of Yugoslavia. He was secretary of the third local LCYY group.
 Dokse Filiposki ― partisan during the People Lberation war of Macedonia. He was kidnaped by a corrupted Albanian police officer in 1943 during the Italian protectorate of Albania.
 Niko Filiposki ― local activist in the mid 20th century.
 Pavle Filiposki ― local sports activist in the mid 20th century.
 Kosto Filiposki ― local activist in the mid 20th century.
 Dragan Filiposki ― local activist in the mid 20th century.
 The brothers Ilija, Blagoja, Filip and Vase Filipovski who gave endowment for renovation of the local and old Saint Paraskeva of the Balkans Church, as a commemoration of their parents Kire and Evgena. 
 Milica Filiposka ― member of the Board for organizing the Galičnik Wedding Festival.

History of the house
The house was built around 1910 by the Filipovski family — it was built at the time when two of the four brothers, Arse and Ilija, decided to build houses on that place.

References

External links
 National Register of objects that are cultural heritage (List updated to December 31, 2012) (In Macedonian)
 Office for Protection of Cultural Heritage (In Macedonian)

Galičnik
Cultural heritage of North Macedonia
Historic houses